Live at the Blue Note is an album released by Michel Camilo on August 26, 2003. It was recorded at the Blue Note club in New York City in March 2003. Camilo, with Charles Flores, Horacio "El Negro" Hernández and Robert Friedrich, were awarded the Grammy Award for Best Latin Jazz Album for this release.

Track listing
The track listing from Allmusic.

Disc 1

Disc 2

References

2003 live albums
Michel Camilo live albums
Grammy Award for Best Latin Jazz Album
Albums recorded at the Blue Note Jazz Club